This is a list of top United Liberation Front of Assam leaders. Some of them are founder members and 16 are from the Central Committee, the supreme authority of decision-making of the outfit.

Political wing

Military Wing

See also
ULFA
SULFA
Sanjukta Mukti Fouj
28th Battalion (ULFA)
 Bhomita Talukdar

References

External links
Terrorist outfit ULFA
Ang Ang bharat ka toot raha hai
Autumn in Springtime-The ULFA battles for survival by Jaideep Saikia
 End of an initiative in Assam By Nava Thakuria
 Raju Barua gets bail finally, will be moving out from jail tomorrow Times of Assam

Leaders
ULFA leaders